"Wherever I May Roam" is a song by American heavy metal band Metallica. It was released in October 1992 as the fourth single from their eponymous fifth album, Metallica. It reached number 82 on the US Billboard Hot 100 peaked at number twenty-five on the Billboard Album Rock Tracks chart, and peaked at number two in Denmark, Finland and Norway.

Music

All stringed instruments featured in this song, both guitars and basses, use standard tuning. The original recording of the song is notable for its unusual instrumentation for the band: Asian instruments such as a gong and sitar-like-guitar feature, along with an overdubbed Warwick twelve-string bass. This 12-string bass was only used for effect during the intro to emphasize several accented notes and then a standard tuned 4-string bass was used as the main bass instrument throughout the remainder of the recording.

The song is performed frequently during the band's live concerts, and was performed with the San Francisco Symphony Orchestra (conducted by Michael Kamen) on the live S&M and its companion DVD, as well as the 2019 S&M2.  When performed live, the band has always relied on their original sitar recording for the intro (the band enters on the first accented note to dramatic effect); however, for the S&M concerts guitarist Kirk Hammett utilized a Danelectro electric sitar for the intro before switching to his ESP electric guitar.

The music video featured clips from Metallica behind the scenes and in concert, during their Wherever We May Roam Tour. The video version of the song is edited omitting the first bridge and third chorus and the last line in the second chorus "Where I lay my head is home" edited to end off as the third chorus does on the studio version with the words "That's where" leading into Hammett's guitar solo of the second bridge.

Demo
The song's demo was recorded in Lars Ulrich's home musical studio "Dungeon" on August 13, 1990.

Track listings
US single
"Wherever I May Roam" – 6:42
"Fade to Black" (live) – 7:43

International single
"Wherever I May Roam" – 6:43
"Fade to Black" (live) – 7:43
"Wherever I May Roam" (demo) – 5:35

International digipak single
"Wherever I May Roam" – 6:45
"Last Caress" (live)/"Am I Evil?" (live)/"Battery" (live) – 11:59

Japanese EP
"Wherever I May Roam" – 6:44
"Fade to Black" (live) – 7:44
"Last Caress" (live)/"Am I Evil?" (live)/"Battery" (live) – 11:59

Charts

Certifications

References

1991 songs
1992 singles
Metallica songs
Songs written by James Hetfield
Songs written by Lars Ulrich
Music videos directed by Wayne Isham
Elektra Records singles
Song recordings produced by Bob Rock